Horace Norman Vincent Tonks (29 January 1891 – 25 November 1959) was an Anglican colonial bishop in the Windward Islands from 1936 until 1949.

He was born in Walsall, England, on 29 January 1891 to Henry and Emily Tonks and educated at the town's Queen Mary's Grammar School and Lichfield Theological College. Ordained in 1918 after a curacy in Fenton, he was priest in charge of Holy Cross, Airedale, then from 1926 to 1935 the vicar of Saint Sampson with Holy Trinity in York. After that he was Archdeacon of Grenada for a brief period in 1935 and 1936 before his appointment to the episcopate in the Windward Islands. On his return to England, he was Rector of Leybourne in Kent from 1949 to 1956. He died on 25 November 1959.

Family 
In 1921, he married Alice Underwood. They had 3 sons and 2 daughters together.

References

External links 

 Horace Norman Vincent Tonks papers, 1923-1956 at Pitts Theology Library, Candler School of Theology

1891 births
People from Walsall
Archdeacons of Grenada
20th-century Anglican bishops in the Caribbean
Deans of St George's Cathedral, Kingstown
Anglican bishops of the Windward Islands
1959 deaths
People educated at Queen Mary's Grammar School
Alumni of Lichfield Theological College